Club Deportivo Liberación is a Paraguayan football club in the city of Liberación in the San Pedro Department. It was founded in 2014. The club's highest achievement was finishing 3rd in the 2015 División Intermedia.

History
The club played in Paraguay's second tier, the División Intermedia, from 2015 to 2018. In 2018, the club was coached by former footballer Edgar Denis.

Stadium
The club plays its home games at the Estadio Juan José Vazquéz in San Estanislao, the stadium of neighbour city club Deportivo Santani.

References

External links
 Soccerway Profile

Football in Paraguay